Alcarreña is a domesticated breed of sheep found in Spain. They are bred for their meat.  The alcarreña is a member of the entrefino class of sheep.

Characteristics
The Alcarreña are white but are occasionally all black with light brown markings on the head and legs. Rams and ewes are polled (hornless).

References

Sheep breeds originating in Spain